Petřvald is a town in Karviná District in the Moravian-Silesian Region of the Czech Republic. It has about 7,400 inhabitants. It lies in the historical region of Cieszyn Silesia.

History

The creation of the village was a part of a larger settlement campaign taking place in the late 13th century on the territory of what will be later known as Upper Silesia. The settlement was first mentioned in a Latin document of Diocese of Wrocław called Liber fundationis episcopatus Vratislaviensis from 1305 as Petirwalde.

Politically the village belonged initially to the Duchy of Teschen, ruled by a local branch of Piast dynasty. In 1327 the duchy became a fee of Kingdom of Bohemia, which after 1526 became part of the Habsburg monarchy.

The village became a seat of a Catholic parish, mentioned in the register of Peter's Pence payment from 1447 among 50 parishes of Teschen deaconry as Petirswalde. After 1540s Protestant Reformation prevailed in the Duchy of Teschen and a local Catholic church was taken over by Lutherans. It was taken from them (as one from around fifty buildings in the region) by a special commission and given back to the Roman Catholic Church on 26 March 1654.

In around 1790, Petřvald was bought by the Larisch-Moennich family, who became its most significant owners and held it until the 20th century. In 1833, coal began to be mined here. Two shafts were opened, both owned by the Larisch-Moennich family. In the second half of the 19th century, additional mines were established. Coal mining has fundamentally affected the development of the municipality.

After World War I, Polish–Czechoslovak War and the division of Cieszyn Silesia in 1920, it became a part of Czechoslovakia. Following the Munich Agreement, in October 1938 together with the Zaolzie region it was annexed by Poland, administratively organised in Frysztat County of Silesian Voivodeship. It was then annexed by Nazi Germany at the beginning of World War II. After the war it was restored to Czechoslovakia.

In 1955, Petřvald became a town. In 1998, coal mining was definitively stopped.

Demographics

Sights
The most important monument is the Church of Saint Henry. A parish church in Petřvald was first mentioned in 1390. The old wooden church was replaced by a new wooden one in the 18th century. The current brick church was built by Jidnřich Larisch-Moennich in 1835–1837. The church complex includes Stations of the Cross.

Notable people
Vojtěch Mynář (1944–2018), politician

Twin towns – sister cities

Petřvald is twinned with:
 Jasienica, Poland
 Strumień, Poland

References

External links

 

Cities and towns in the Czech Republic
Populated places in Karviná District
Cieszyn Silesia